Eoophyla gibbosalis is a moth in the family Crambidae. It was described by Achille Guenée in 1854. It is found on Sulawesi and Java and in Sri Lanka.

References

Eoophyla
Moths described in 1854
Moths of Indonesia
Moths of Sri Lanka